The  Gauss Lectureship (Gauß-Vorlesung) is an annually awarded mathematical distinction, named in honor of Carl Friedrich Gauss. It was established in 2001 by the German Mathematical Society with a series of lectures for a broad audience.

Each Gauss Lecture is paired with another presentation on the history of mathematics.

Gauss Lecturers

See also

 List of mathematics awards

References

External links 
 Gauss Lectureship 
 Archive of the Gauss Lectureship 

German science and technology awards
Mathematics awards
Carl Friedrich Gauss
Lecture series